Triangle House, originally known as Safmarine House, is a  building in Cape Town, South Africa. Construction work began in 1991 and it was completed in 1993 by Murray & Roberts Construction, now known as Concor at a cost of US$6,000,000 (equivalent to US$9,610,000 in 2018). it was the last skyscraper built in Cape Town until the completion of the Portside Tower 21 years later in 2014.  The building was originally named after its first occupant, the South African shipping company Safmarine.  The building was originally owned by Old Mutual Investment Group Property Investments.

The cruciform building plan gives each of the four units on each floor added natural light, ventilation and views. The exterior of the building is clad in Rosa Duna granite, Rock Face granite and Rustenberg granite.

In 2017 the building was renovated converting its office space into 166 residences and a 5-star Radisson Blu Hotel by Signatura property group and Carlson Rezidor Hotel Group costing R1 billion.

References

Buildings and structures in Cape Town
Skyscrapers in Cape Town
Skyscraper office buildings in South Africa
Office buildings completed in 1993
20th-century architecture in South Africa